Murray Hamilton Ross Thompson  (born 27 December 1953) is a former member of the Victorian Legislative Assembly. He was the member for Sandringham in the Victorian Legislative Assembly from 1992 until his retirement in 2018. He is the son of former Liberal Premier of Victoria Lindsay Thompson.

Early life and education
Thompson was educated at Caulfield Grammar School in Melbourne where he served as captain of football and member of debating team (1971–72), and was school captain in 1972. He was a member of the Caulfield Grammarians Cricket Club from 1973 to 1980. Thompson earned both a Bachelor of Arts (1979), a Bachelor of Laws (1981) from Monash University where he was Student Representative on the Law Faculty Ad Hoc Committee on Professional Practice (1979) and Law Student Society Committee Member. His postgraduate study earned him a Diploma of Education (1986) from Melbourne University.

Thompson was an Australian rules footballer playing as a midfielder for Richmond in the VFL until three knee operations caused him to retire after fourteen senior games.

Career
Thompson was admitted to the Victorian Bar in 1982, and set up his own suburban legal practice, practising as a solicitor before being elected as Liberal Member for Sandringham in 1992 Victorian state election.

As a member of Parliament, he served on the Liberal frontbench in a range of portfolios in opposition, from December 2002 until being dumped from the front bench in 2008.
Thompson unsuccessfully contested the Liberal Party leadership against then Major Projects Minister Denis Napthine in the ballot resulting from the resignation of Premier Ted Baillieu.

In 2008, Thompson voted against legalising abortion in Victoria, and in 2015, voted against banning anti-abortion groups from protesting outside abortion clinics.

He retired from parliament at the 2018 Victorian state election.

References

Bibliography
 Hogan P: The Tigers of Old, Richmond FC, Melbourne 1996

External links
 Parliamentary voting record of Murray Thompson at Victorian Parliament Tracker
Parliamentary page

1953 births
Living people
Australian rules footballers from Melbourne
Members of the Victorian Legislative Assembly
People educated at Caulfield Grammar School
Richmond Football Club players
Caulfield Grammarians Football Club players
Liberal Party of Australia members of the Parliament of Victoria
Monash Law School alumni
Australian sportsperson-politicians
21st-century Australian politicians
Recipients of the Medal of the Order of Australia
Politicians from Melbourne